Triptych, 1976 is a large triptych painted by the British artist Francis Bacon in 1976. It comprises three oil and pastel paintings on canvas. It is the second most expensive Bacon ever sold, after Three Studies of Lucian Freud, being auctioned for US$86 million in 2008.
 
The triptych is a large three panel painting (each panel measuring 78 x 58 in, 198 x 147.5 cm), with dense colors and abstract shapes. Bacon used his usual technique, starting on the left panel and working across. The piece draws on classical Greek iconography and mythology, and makes reference to Prometheus, as several interpretations claim. Bacon's friend, Peter Beard, was used as a model for one of the figures.

In 2008 it was sold to the Russian businessman Roman Abramovich, in a Sotheby's auction on May 14, 2008 for $86 million, above the pre-sale estimate of $70 million. Prior to Abramovich, it was owned in a private European collection since its purchase from the Marlborough Gallery, London in 1977.

References

1976 paintings
Paintings by Francis Bacon
Triptychs